Hold Out is the sixth album by American singer-songwriter Jackson Browne, released in 1980. Although critically the album has not been as well received as other Browne recordings, it remains his only album to date to reach number 1 on the Billboard chart.

History
The song "Of Missing Persons" was written for Inara George, the daughter of Lowell George (formerly of the band Little Feat), a songwriting collaborator and longtime friend of Jackson Browne's who died a year prior to the release of Hold Out. The phrase "of missing persons" was derived from a line in a Little Feat song, "Long Distance Love".

The album was certified as a Gold and Platinum record in 1980 by the RIAA. It reached Multi-platinum in 2001.

Reception

Despite being Browne's only album to date to reach number 1 in the Billboard charts, it received poor critical reviews. Writing retrospectively for Allmusic, music critic William Rulhmann called some of the tracks awkward or foolish. He compared the album with earlier releases: "If Browne was still trying to write himself out of the cul-de-sac he had created for himself early on, Hold Out represented an earnest attempt that nevertheless fell short." Similarly, critic Robert Christgau wrote "Never hep to his jive, I'm less than shocked by the generalized sentimentality disillusioned admirers descry within these hallowed tracks, though the one about the late great Lowell George... is unusually rank."

Track listing
All tracks are written by Jackson Browne except where noted.
 "Disco Apocalypse" – 5:08
 "Hold Out" – 5:37
 "That Girl Could Sing" – 4:34
 "Boulevard" – 3:15
 "Of Missing Persons" – 6:31
 "Call It a Loan" (Browne, David Lindley) – 4:35
 "Hold On Hold Out" (Browne, Craig Doerge) – 8:08

Personnel 
 Jackson Browne – lead vocals, acoustic piano, electric guitar
 Craig Doerge – Fender Rhodes, Hammond organ, string synthesizer, Wurlitzer electric piano (3), acoustic piano (7)
 Bill Payne – Hammond organ (1, 2, 5, 6, 7), string synthesizer (7)
 David Lindley – electric guitar, lap steel guitar
 Bob Glaub – bass guitar
 Russ Kunkel – drums (1, 2, 3, 5, 6, 7)
 Rick Marotta – hi-hat (3), tom toms (3), drums (4)
 Joe Lala – percussion (1)
 Danny Kortchmar – maracas (4)
 Rosemary Butler – backing vocals
 Doug Haywood – backing vocals

Production 
 Producers – Jackson Browne and Greg Ladanyi
 Production assistance – Rusty Conway and Donald Miller
 Engineer – Greg Ladanyi 
 Assistant engineers – Brent Averill, Niko Bolas, James Ledner, Jim Nipar, Sergio Reyes, Karen Siegal and George Ybarra.
 Mixed by Buford Jones
 Mastered by Doug Sax at The Mastering Lab (Los Angeles, CA).
 Album cover – Dawn Patrol
 Design and photography – Jimmy Wachtel
 Management – Peter Golden & Associates

Charts
Album – Billboard (United States)

Singles – Billboard (United States)

References

Jackson Browne albums
1980 albums
Asylum Records albums
Albums produced by Greg Ladanyi
Albums with cover art by Jimmy Wachtel